James Joseph Beckman (March 1, 1905 – December 5, 1974) was a pitcher in Major League Baseball. He played for the Cincinnati Reds.

References

External links

1905 births
1974 deaths
Major League Baseball pitchers
Cincinnati Reds players
Baseball players from Cincinnati